Leamside is a small village close to the city of Durham, County Durham, in England. It is situated to the west of West Rainton.  It is part of the civil parish of West Rainton.

Notable residents
Edward Fenwick Boyd (1810-1889), industrialist who built and lived in Moor House in the village 
Janet Boyd (1850-1928), militant suffragette

See also
Leamside railway station

References

External links

 Census information

Villages in County Durham